Geof Motley OAM (born 3 January 1935) is a former Australian rules footballer and coach who played for South Australian National Football League (SANFL) side Port Adelaide. Motley was born near Alberton Oval, the home ground of the Port Adelaide Football Club, and grew up supporting Port Adelaide.

Port Adelaide (1954-1966) 
For eight seasons (1959–1966) Motley captained the then dominating team of the League, including a stint as captain-coach from 1959 to 1961.  He was the only man to appear in all nine of the Magpies premiership teams between 1954 and 1965. Motley played a total of 258 games for Port between 1953 and 1966 and also represented South Australia on 28 occasions. 

During his career, Motley was never dropped from the league team and was never reported. During his time in league football, not being reported for foul play was a rare thing for a player as at the time having a certain amount of mongrel or thuggery was seen a common thing.

Motley was named Port Adelaide's best and fairest player in 1958, 1959, 1963, and 1965; and won the Magarey Medal in 1964.

Motley was captain-coach of the Magpies 1959 premiership winning side.

North Adelaide coach (1967-1969) 
Geof Motley went on to coach North Adelaide in 1967-1969, taking the club to 3rd, 3rd, and 5th. They won the minor premiership in 1967 but were unable to compete successfully against Sturt and Port Adelaide in the major round. Under Motley's tutelage, Australian Football Hall of Fame Legend Barrie Robran debuted and won his first Magarey Medal.

After football 
Since retiring, Motley has been bestowed with several honours including life membership of Port Adelaide and the SANFL, and membership of the South Australian Football Hall of Fame and the Australian Football Hall of Fame. In 2001 Motley was named on a half-back flank in Port Adelaide's 'Greatest Team of All Time'.

Personal life 
Geof was married to Gaynor who played for Australia in basketball (competing in the first world championships in Rio de Janeiro) and netball, and represented South Australia in softball until her death on 21 February 1999.

Their son, Peter Motley played for rival SANFL club Sturt and Victorian Football League (VFL) club Carlton, while Motley's second cousin is former Port Adelaide captain Warren Tredrea.

Note: "Geof" is the correct spelling of his name.

References

External links 
 Geof Motley at Port Adelaide Football Club
 Geof Motley at SANFL Hall of Fame
 North Adelaide Football Club
 

Australian rules footballers from South Australia
Magarey Medal winners
Members of the Order of Australia
Port Adelaide Football Club (SANFL) players
Port Adelaide Football Club players (all competitions)
Port Adelaide Football Club (SANFL) coaches
North Adelaide Football Club coaches
Australian Football Hall of Fame inductees
South Australian Football Hall of Fame inductees
Living people
1935 births